The (Old) Church of São Mateus da Calheta are the ruins of a 16th-century church situated along the coast of the civil parish of São Mateus da Calheta, municipality of Angra do Heroísmo, on the Portuguese island of Terceira, in the archipelago of the Azores. Reconstructed at the end of the 17th, or beginning of the 18th, century, the church was abandoned after a hurricane caused severe damage. The interior includes a baptismal font dating to the 16th century, although largely an open air ruin; the structure has experienced several interventions throughout the centuries, with the building painted and maintained in its post-hurricane state.

History

The primitive parochial church of São Mateus was erected at the edge of São Mateus da Calheta sometime before 1557, in order to substitute the hermitage of Nossa Senhora da Luz, to support local veneration. From the beginning the temple was small and too close to the sea, located along the coast overlooking the rocky ocean cliffs. Due to its proximity to the sea, it was usually seen by the fishing boats that plied the coast, and normally the first that visiting ships spotted travelling from the Americas. The first reference to the temple occurred on 6 February 1557, in the testament of Pedro Cota da Malha (who revealed that it remained unfinished). As he requested: We order and request that our remains of either, at the cost of heritage, be used to complete the church of the apostle Saint Mathew of Calheta.

From the writings of Lieutenant Colonel José Agostinho, around 1560, the settlement was elevated to ecclesiastical parish, an area that extended along Canada da Cruz Dourada and Canada do Capitão-mor, with the church at center. A reference document was also issued in 1568 for the parish of São Mateus da Prainha.

An account of the Castilian invasion of Terceira in 1611 identified the Baía das Mós, the island's subsequent occupation and the existence of a community just below the parish of São Bartolomeu: " near the city, is another of the apostle of Saint Mathew, along the sea". In 1640, during the first half of the decade, from the writings of Friar Diogo das Chagas identified the church, "...along the sea, in good cultivatable lands, that are not large owing to the rocky ground surrounding it, is the authority and parish of the glorious apostle of Saint Mathew, which is on this located a musket's distance from the coast, and where from hear until the city, just vineyards, of which there are several good estates and authorized hermitages".

The first registers in the parish occurred in 1641.

Father Manuel Luís Maldonado, writing in the April issue of Fenix Angrense, describes the acts of the penitents in the parish, following the 26 March 1690 storm and 5 April earthquake, and the connection with their neighbors in São Bartolomeu dos Regatos.

Sometime between 1694 and 1700, the primitive church was demolished and then reconstructed farther into the interior, while a cross was erected on the site of the old temple (marking the location of the old altar). During the construction, the parishioners reoccupied the old Hermitage of Luz. Around 1695, from the writings of Friar Agostinho de Monte Alverne, the parish of Saint Mathew, in Calheta, had a vicar, treasurer and curate, serving 100 homes and 250 confessing souls (based at the hermitage of Nossa Senhora da Luz). In 1700, the new church, which was later referred to as the Old Church was completed. By 1710, São Mateus had approximately 50 residents.

By 1891, though, Father José Alves da Silva recorded the need for a new church even, since it was small and distant from the main settlement, since it was constructed in Biscoitinho and area of Prainha, near the port.

On 28 August 1893, a hurricane caused large damage the church, resulting in its abandonment. On 21 September 1895, owing to the considerable problems historically with the church's location, the first cornerstone was placed on the new Church of São Mateus da Calheta, on lands donated by a benefactor, further to the interior of the settlement and away from the sea. Following the beginning of services the old parochial church was completely abandon, in addition to coastal road area leading to the church.

Architecture

The church is located on the western edge of the main settlement of São Mateus da Calheta, implanted in the areas of Biscoitinho and Prainha, near the port, and alongside the historical Caminho Velho road: the area has direct views of Angra do Heroísmo, Monte Brasil and the volcano of Santa Bárbara. The church courtyard is relatively large, with a four-step staircase leading to the main door, buttressed by the old cemetery wall.

The relatively small, modestly-constructed church, it was constructed of brickwork, and large poulders, that were able to resist intact the hurricane that would result in its abandon. It consists of a single rectangular naive and narrower presbytery, with left-lateral, rectangular bell-tower and right-lateral sacristy. The spaces include the central aisle, today exposed to the open air, with smaller covered sacristy in roofing tiles. Most of the facades were plastered and painted white, while pillars, corners and some cornices, the sacristy corners, frontispiece and cornices painted in grey.

The principal facade is marked by a sundial-type clock constructed of light stone, over dark basalt. The bell-tower, which is accessible by a lateral staircase on the church exterior, is also constructed of local basalt. The two-story bell-tower (on the west) is separated by frieze, with the first register marked by a small square window and the second by arches over pilasters (housing the bells), topped by a white pyramidal roof. Its bells long since removed, the belfry includes arched windows in the cardinal points towards Angra, Monte Brasil, Santa Bárbara volcano and the civil parish of São Mateus.

The principal facade is oriented toward the south, circled by a cornice and terminated by frontispiece topped by acroterion, and straight framed-portal surmounted by frieze and cornice line, superimposed by two pinnacles and two fins, framing a circular sundial. Over the portico is a rectangular framed window, interrupted by the frontispiece's cornice, and laterally by windows. The two-story lateral facades are defined by pilasters, with the first register marked by simple framed doors, while the second-floor by capialço (left) and archway. The presbytery is marked four veins of the same height, that correspond to the two porticoes and central windows on a higher plane of capialço's crevice. On the right side, are framed rectangular-windows of the chancel and sacristy, towards the south, while a smaller unframed-window graded faces the east. The posterior facade of the chancel is terminated in a straight gable.

Interior
The interior of the temple are constructed with brickwork stone, while in some areas there are vestiges of plastered and white-painted walls, parallel pavement stone and stone aisles.

Along the back wall are evenly-spaced orifices, indicating the support areas for the old high-choir. To the west (of the left entrance) is the baptistery marked by arched doorway, sheltering a semi-circular stone baptismal fountain decorated with various motifs and along the back wall an old closet.

At the top of the nave are two lateral arches over Tuscan pillars, and large archway marking the altar.

References

Notes

Sources
 
 
 
 
 

Buildings and structures in Angra do Heroísmo
Sao Mateus Calheta Old